Live in Buenos Aires is the fifth live album by British rock band Coldplay. It was recorded on 14 and 15 November 2017 in La Plata, the final concerts of the A Head Full of Dreams Tour. The release happened on 7 December 2018 along with Live in São Paulo, which was filmed on 7 and 8 November 2017. Together, they make up for the band's ninth compilation, The Butterfly Package, a set that also includes the Coldplay: A Head Full of Dreams film, a career-spanning documentary directed by Mat Whitecross. This release marked the first time one of the band's concerts was released in full.

Packaging
Icelandic artist Kristjana S. Williams was responsible for creating the package's artwork. It was made available as a two-DVD/two-CD set and a two-DVD/three gold vinyl set, both of them are labelled as The Butterfly Package. A two-CD set featuring Live in Buenos Aires on its own was also made available along with a download and streaming release. The Live in São Paulo film, on the other hand, can only be downloaded or bought as part of the compilation album.

Promotion
The band had announced the release of the A Head Full of Dreams documentary in mid-October. The following week, the set was announced by the band on social media with a clip of them performing "Viva la Vida", on November 2 live performance of "Fix You" and on November 29, "A Head Full of Dreams" To promote the premiere of A Head Full of Dreams on Amazon Prime Video, Coldplay premiered three live tracks through Amazon Music from 26 October: "Stayin' Alive" (live at Glastonbury) with Barry Gibb; "Us Against the World" (live in Leipzig) and "Don't Panic" (live in Paris).

Controversy
The newspaper El Día of La Plata, the city where the concert took place in Argentina, questioned the album's/video's title for including the city name Buenos Aires, which is located a distant 60 kilometers away from La Plata. According to the article, "Although for many this situation is a trifle, for others it is a great disappointment when their idols do not name their city, especially after years and years of having crossed the highway to go see these great events. That's why the disappointment, being local, is greater, they feel ignored."

Track listing
All tracks written by Guy Berryman, Jonny Buckland, Will Champion, and Chris Martin, except where noted.

2 CDs / Digital download

Personnel
 Guy Berryman – bass guitar, keyboard, backing vocals
 Jonny Buckland – electric guitar, keyboard, backing vocals
 Will Champion – drums, electronic drums, backing vocals, percussion, acoustic guitar, piano; lead vocals on "In My Place"
 Chris Martin – lead vocals, keyboards, acoustic guitar, piano; backing vocals on "In My Place"

Charts

Weekly charts

Year-end charts

Certifications

References

2018 live albums
2018 video albums
Coldplay live albums
Coldplay video albums
Parlophone live albums
Parlophone video albums
Live albums recorded in Buenos Aires